"Universal Prayer" is a song recorded by Italian singer Tiziano Ferro and English singer Jamelia for the soundtrack to the 2004 Summer Olympic games. It was written by Ferro and Jamelia along with Tom Nichols, Mikkel Storleer Eriksen, and Tor Erik Hermansen, while production was helmed by Eriksen and Hermansen under their production moniker Stargate. Released as a standalone single in August 2004, the song became a number-one hit in Greece, Italy, and Spain. "Universal Prayer" was later added to the re-issue of Jamelia's second studio album Thank You (2003).

Track listing

Charts

References

2004 singles
Jamelia songs
Tiziano Ferro songs
Number-one singles in Italy
Number-one singles in Spain
Songs written by Tiziano Ferro
Songs written by Tor Erik Hermansen
Songs written by Mikkel Storleer Eriksen
Songs written by Tom Nichols (songwriter)
2003 songs
Songs written by Jamelia